Modern drag races are started electronically by a system known as a Christmas tree. A common Christmas tree consists of a column of seven lights for each driver or lane, as well as a set of light beams across the track itself. Each side of the column of lights is the same; from the top down, there are a blue LED light set, then three amber bulbs, then a green bulb and a red bulb. The light beams are arranged with one set on the starting line, and another set 7 inches behind it.

When drivers are preparing to race, they first cross the beams 7 inches behind the starting line. Crossing this beam activates the top bulbs. At this point, with most modern starting lights, the tree is activated.  Once pre-staged, drivers roll up 7 inches and cross the second beam on the starting line, bottom bulbs,  Once the first driver activates the bottom bulbs, the subsequent drivers have seven seconds or they are timed out and automatically disqualified, even in qualifying (a red-light foul is ignored in qualifying).  Once all drivers have crossed the staged sensor or are timed out, the automatic starting system will activate the next lighting sequence within 1.3 seconds of the last car being staged or being disqualified. 

After this point, the lighting sequence will be different based on the type of tree and start that a race is using. The "Standard" tree will light up each large amber light consecutively with a .500 second delay in between them, then followed by the green light after another .500 second delay. A "Professional" tree will light up all of the large amber lights simultaneously, and then after a .400 second delay, light up the green light. Some classes will use a hybrid tree, known as a .500 Professional tree, where the delay is .500 seconds instead of the .400 seconds used in a standard Professional tree.  On the activation of the green light from either style of tree, the drivers are supposed to start the race. Leaving the "Staged" line before the green light activates will instantly stop the count down and result in a lighting of the red light and a provisional disqualification of the offending driver in heads-up starts only.  In a Professional Tree or a Standard Tree with a heads-up start, if both drivers leave before the green light activates, only the first to leave will be charged with a provisional disqualification.  In a Standard Tree with staggered start times, a green light will be shown to the first driver, regardless if he jumped or not, and once the second driver takes the start, if one driver jumped the start, then that driver's lane will display the red light.  If both drivers jump, only the driver whose infraction was worse will be shown the red light, as if it was a heads-up start.  If the driver that did not activate the red light in their lane commits a further foul during the run (crossing a lane boundary or hitting the barrier), and the driver who commits a red-light foul does not cross a boundary line, the red light violation is overturned and the driver who crosses the boundary line is disqualified, with the driver who committed the red-light foul winning the round.

Origination
There continues to be controversy, even today, as to who was actual inventor of the Christmas Tree. According to an article published in the September 13, 2013 issue of National Dragster, official magazine of the National Hot Rod Association (NHRA), it mentions in an old newspaper article from LaVerne, California, that Chrondek Corporation founder Oilver Riley was approached in 1962 by NHRA National Field Director Ed Eaton with an idea of a step-light countdown system. Research on a portable timing system was already in the works before this proposal. Due to the development of bracket racing in order to fill vehicle classes, where a slower car leaves ahead of the faster car during a pass, the slower car would begin further down the track from the other depending on elapsed time. The flagman (or starter) would stand a few feet ahead of the slower car, which caused a serious safety issue. Also, starting times by the flagman were not uniformally accurate. This new timing system would, hopefully, correct these problems. Dragtronics owner and NHRA Division 1 Director Lew Bond also helped with the development of the Christmas Tree, which was debuted by Chrondek at the 1963 U.S. Nationals in Indianapolis, Indiana.

Another claim regarding invention of the Christmas Tree is by Wilfred H. "W.H." David, Jr., founder of the Pel State Timing Association in Lafayette, Louisiana. He created the first Christmas Tree sometime in the late 1950s and sold the rights a few years later to Chrondek Corporation for mass production. The naming apparently came from the use of small glass Christmas tree lights David used for his miniature prototype.

Regardless of the actual inventor(s), the Christmas Tree and timing system is a marvel in drag racing history.

Tree changes
The Christmas Tree has changed three times since its original debut in 1963 for the U.S. Nationals at Indianapolis Raceway Park.  The original Tree had five amber lights, but no pre-stage or stage bulbs.  A pair of small amber bulbs, originally located at the start line, known as the pre-stage and stage bulbs, were added in 1964 Winternationals, held at the Los Angeles Fairplex (which still conducts the races today).  Each of the five yellow lights were lit consecutively at a .500 delay before the light turned green.

For the 1971 season, the Professional Tree was instituted;  only the fifth of five yellow bulbs (the last) was lit, followed by four-tenths of a second later, the green light, for professional classes.

As the Pro Stock class was having issues with hood scoops and the visibility of the only amber light being lit (bottom) before the green light, the NHRA, as part of Christmas Tree changes in 1986, instituted the first major overhaul of the Tree;  two amber lights were removed on each side, making the tree three amber lights before green.  The NHRA said they could save around four minutes with the reduction of starts by one second in sportsman classes.  The second change was made in the Professional tree configuration.  All three amber lights turn on together before the tree turns green.

NHRA introduced another significant change to the Tree, switching to LEDs instead of incandescent bulbs, at Pomona in 2003. This saved changing as many as twenty bulbs at a meet due to filaments being broken by the vibration from exhausts of Top Fuel cars. It also led to a drop in reaction times.

Prior to the 2009 season, the starter activated the tree.  The NHRA and drivers discovered drivers were aware when the NHRA official would trigger the switch after both cars were staged, so code was written to create a random delay between the second car staged and the lights starting in order to prevent drivers from "guessing" the tree activation.

Prior to the 2011 Charlotte spring race, the small amber bulbs were replaced with the current blue bulb.  For the Charlotte and starting in 2018, Las Vegas, spring races, there are four horizontally-aligned blue bulbs, representing the four lanes (Charlotte and Las Vegas April races are four-lane races).  Two weeks later at Royal Purple Raceway in Baytown, Texas, the current standard Christmas Tree was adopted, with only two blue bulbs for the two lanes.

Starting in 2016 for selected bracket races, CompuLink debuted the TruStart system for staggered start races.  Prior to that, if the first driver left before the green, the light turned red automatically and the other driver was shown a green light, regardless of the infraction.

Timing system manufacturers
Since 1984, the NHRA officially uses CompuLink timing systems at venues on their professional drag racing circuit (includes the Christmas Tree, control units, timing sensors, cables, program software and time slip printer). Many divisional tracks for both the NHRA and IHRA also use CompuLink, but current timing system manufacturers of similar operations including Accutime, TSI, PortaTree and RaceAmerica among others can be seen at various drag strips throughout the world so long as these timing systems comply to rules and regulations set forth by the respective drag racing organizations for which they are members. There are still a few drag strips which continue to use the much older Chrondek timing system, although the company was sold to Daktronics in the 1980s and parts for that system are no longer made. Most drag racing time scoreboards currently seen at the tracks are provided by Daktronics, RaceAmerica or Accutime.

References

Auto racing equipment